Milocera is a genus of moth in the family Geometridae.

Type species
Milocera horaria  Swinhoe, 1904

Species
Species of this genus are:

Milocera arcifera  (Hampson, 1910)
Milocera atreus Krüger, 2001
Milocera aureolitoralis Krüger, 2001
Milocera aurora Krüger, 2001
Milocera dubia  (Prout, 1917)
Milocera depauperata Krüger, 2001
Milocera diffusata  (Warren, 1902)
Milocera divorsa  Prout, 1922
Milocera eugompha Krüger, 2001
Milocera falcula  Prout, 1934
Milocera herbuloti Krüger, 2001
Milocera horaria Swinhoe 1904
Milocera hypamycha Krüger, 2001
Milocera ja Krüger, 2001
Milocera obfuscata Krüger, 2001
Milocera pelops Krüger, 2001
Milocera podocarpi  Prout, 1932
Milocera pyrinia  Prout, 1934
Milocera scoblei Krüger, 2001
Milocera sexocornuta Krüger, 2001
Milocera tantalus Krüger, 2001
Milocera thyestes Krüger, 2001
Milocera umbrosa  Herbulot, 1989
Milocera ustatata  Herbulot, 1973
Milocera ustatoides Krüger, 2001
Milocera zika Krüger, 2001

References

Macariini
Geometridae genera